Chionanthus palustris grows as a tree up to  tall, with a trunk diameter of up to . The bark is light brown. The flowers are yellowish green. The specific epithet palustris is from the Latin meaning "swampy", referring to the habitat. Habitat is lowland swamp and forests. C. palustris is endemic to Borneo.

It was first described and published by Ruth Kiew in Malaysian Forester Vol.43 on page 382 in 1980.

References

palustris
Endemic flora of Borneo
Trees of Borneo
Plants described in 1980